Osher Zeitun (born 14 January 1991) is an Israeli association football player currently contracted to Hapoel Iksal.

Biography

Playing career
Zeitun made his professional debut for Hapoel Be'er Sheva, coming on as a substitute for Eliran Efriat, in a 0–0 Liga Leumit draw against Ironi Nir Ramat HaSharon on 29 August 2008.

International career
Zeitun represented Israel at the 2009 Maccabiah Games, winning a bronze medal.

References

Footnotes

1991 births
Living people
Israeli footballers
Association football defenders
Liga Leumit players
Maccabi Haifa F.C. players
Hapoel Be'er Sheva F.C. players
Beitar Nes Tubruk F.C. players
Hapoel Daliyat al-Karmel F.C. players
Ironi Tiberias F.C. players
Bnei Eilat F.C. players
Hapoel Iksal F.C. players
Maccabiah Games bronze medalists for Israel
Maccabiah Games medalists in football
Competitors at the 2009 Maccabiah Games
Footballers from Nesher